The 2022–23 Salvadoran gang crackdown, referred to in El Salvador as the Régimen de Excepción (Spanish for State of Exception) and the Guerra Contra las Pandillas (Spanish for War Against the Gangs), began in March 2022 in response to a crime spike between 25 and 27 March 2022, when 87 people were killed in El Salvador. The Salvadoran government blamed the spike in murders on criminal gangs in the country, resulting in the country's legislature approving a state of emergency that suspended the rights of association and legal counsel, and increased the time spent in detention without charge, among other measures that expanded the powers of law enforcement in the country.

As of 16 March 2023, over 66,000 people accused of having gang affiliations have been arrested, which has overcrowded El Salvador's prisons. Domestically, the crackdown has been popular among Salvadorans weary of gang violence. Conversely, human rights groups expressed concern that the arrests were arbitrary and had little to do with gang violence, and several U.S. government representatives expressed concern about the violence in the country and the methods used to combat it; these comments were criticized by Salvadoran President Nayib Bukele.

In January 2023, Minister of Defense René Merino Monroy announced that the government registered 496 homicides in 2022, a 56.8 percent decrease from 1,147 homicides in 2021. He attributed the decrease in homicides on the gang crackdown.

Background

Historical homicide rates 

For decades, El Salvador had one of the highest rates of gang-related violence in the world. In 2015, the country's homicide rate reached 103 homicides per 100,000 people–or 6,650 homicides registered that year–making it the most violent country in the Western Hemisphere. By 2018, the homicide rate decreased to 52 homicides per 100,000 people (3,340 homicides).

In June 2019, newly inaugurated President Nayib Bukele made combatting gang violence a priority for his administration, and announced his "Territorial Control Plan" which sought to crackdown on gang violence and improve security within the country. Actions taken by the country's security forces included the increase of military and police presence in specific municipalities where gang influence was significant, instituting lockdowns in prisons by confining prisoners to their cells and severing cell phone service in prisons, and improving the equipment and technology used by the National Civil Police (PNC) and the Salvadoran Army.

In 2021, the homicide rate reached the lowest it has been since the Salvadoran Civil War ended in 1992, with 18 homicides per 100,000 people. Although the decline in homicides began in 2016, Bukele attributed it to his policies, and it has been one of his most-touted accomplishments. Bukele enjoys an extremely high approval rating of approximately 85 percent, one of the highest in the world. In December 2021, the United States government accused Bukele of negotiating a secret agreement with the gangs, reducing violence in return for financial and prison benefits. Additionally, the United States Department of the Treasury sanctioned two Salvadoran officials it claimed conducted the talks. Bukele called the accusations of making a deal a "lie" and denounced previous administrations who made similar deals.

April 2020 prison crackdown 

Between 24 and 27 April 2020, a total of 77 people were murdered in El Salvador. Bukele's government claimed that the spike in murders was organized by gang members within El Salvador's prisons, leading to him instituting lockdowns across the country's prisons. Prisoners were confined in their cells 24 hours per day and rival gang members were mixed together in cells. His government published photographs of inmates being rounded up on the prison floor in cramped conditions. Human Rights Watch (HRW) criticized the government's actions as violation of human rights and that it took no considerations for the COVID-19 pandemic.

Crime spike 

From 25 to 27 March 2022, 87 people were murdered in El Salvador, including 62 people on Saturday alone, the highest single-day tally in decades; by contrast, 79 people were murdered throughout the entire month of February. The victims were targeted randomly. The government blamed the violence on Mara Salvatrucha (MS-13). William Eulises Soriano Herrera, a member of Bukele's Nuevas Ideas party, suggested the spike in violence was retaliation for the government's seizing control of two bus routes in the capital, which gangs often extort for revenue; according to José Miguel Cruz, a research director at Florida International University, the gangs may have been sending a message to the government to try to obtain better terms.

Government crackdown 

During an extraordinary session early on 27 March, the Salvadoran Legislative Assembly approved a "state of exception". The order, which was initially set to last thirty days but has been extended twice, suspended the rights of association and legal counsel, increased the amount of time that persons may be detained without being charged from three days to fifteen, and permitted the government to monitor citizens' communications without warrants. However, Salvadoran law enforcement was accused of violating even the expanded limits of their powers. The government also restricted the ability of judges to offer prisoners alternatives to pre-trial detention, like bail and house arrest.

Members of Nuevas Ideas passed new rules that increase prison sentences for convicted gang lords to forty to forty-five years (previously six to nine) and twenty to thirty years for other members (previously three to five) and reduce the age of criminal responsibility, previously sixteen years old, to twelve. They also passed a law that threatens anyone who reproduces or disseminates messages from gangs, including news media, with ten to fifteen years in prison.

The government deployed additional police and military forces, raiding houses and creating checkpoints surrounding neighborhoods with known gang presences. Soldiers checked everyone for identification cards and proof of address, searched their vehicles and backpacks, and refused to let anyone enter or leave without what they considered a legitimate reason. Anyone considered suspicious was forced to strip so soldiers could check for gang-related tattoos.

By the end of 27 March, Salvadoran security forces claimed to have detained 576 people; within a week, almost 6,000 people had been arrested, straining El Salvador's already-overcrowded prisons. Nevertheless, the government pressured the police, military, and judicial system to continue the mass arrests by setting arrest quotas. After one month, more than 17,000 people had been arrested; on 25 May, the National Civil Police announced that more than 34,500 people had been arrested since the start of the state of emergency. Many people were unable to learn where or why relatives were detained. Rations for prisoners were reduced to two meals each day consisting of only beans and tortillas; Bukele explained that he would "not take budget away from schools to feed these terrorists". Prisoners have also been denied mattresses and frog marched, and Bukele ordered that all gang members be confined to their cells 24/7.

In July 2022, Bukele announced the construction of a new prison which will be able to house 40,000 prisoners, making it one of the largest prisons in the world. The prison, known as the Terrorism Confinement Center and located in Tecoluca, opened on 31 January 2023.

On 3 November 2022, Osiris Luna Meza, the minister of justice, announced that the government would begin destroying gravestones belonging to members of gangs to prevent them from becoming "shrines", stating "terrorists will no longer be able to 'glorify' the memory of dead criminals". Despite the destruction of the gravestones, the government stated that the bodies would remain intact and not be disturbed. Bukele compared the removal of the tombstones of gang members to denazification in Allied-occupied Germany and also compared the gangs to the Nazis themselves.

The government initiated a siege of the city of Soyapango on 3 December 2022 when 10,000 soldiers were sent to surround the city and arrest gang members. The government erased gang graffiti from the city during the siege.

The state of exception has been extended for 30 days twelve times by the Legislative Assembly. Nuevas Ideas (NI), the Grand Alliance for National Unity (GANA), the Christian Democratic Party (PDC), the National Coalition Party (PCN), and three independent politicians consistently vote for the extensions, while the Nationalist Republican Alliance (ARENA), the Farabundo Martí National Liberation Front (FMLN), Nuestro Tiempo (NT), and Vamos (V) consistently vote against it.

Reactions 

Domestically, the crackdown was popular. An April 2022 Gallup poll found that 91 percent of Salvadorans supported the government's actions, including 78 percent who supported them "much." Many Salvadorans explained that they were weary of violence, and many Salvadorans living in the United States supported the crackdown. Salvadoran Archbishop José Luis Escobar Alas voiced his open support for the crackdown in July 2022.

Human rights advocates have criticized the arrests as often arbitrary, based on a person's appearance or residence, and expressed concern that innocent people are being caught in the sweeps. Bukele claimed that only 1 percent of arrests would be incorrect, and Salvadoran Defense Minister René Merino Monroy claimed that arrested persons found to have no links to gangs would be freed, saying that "the people need to know that if they're not involved in anything bad, nothing bad will happen to them." Human Rights Watch criticized the government's policy as "first arrest, then tweet, and investigate later", referencing Salvadoran police's tweets depicting people's arrests. Human rights groups have also expressed concern that the arrests have little to do with gang violence, suggesting Bukele will use them to consolidate power and target critics.

In a tweet on 10 April, U.S. Secretary of State Antony Blinken "condemn[ed]" the increase in gang violence in El Salvador and "urge[d]" the government to respect due process and civil liberties. The same day, State Department spokesman Ned Price tweeted affirming that the United States "continues to support El Salvador" against gangs while urging it to protect its citizens and their civil liberties. The next day, Bukele responded that United States' support against Salvadoran gangs had come under the Trump administration, citing the withdrawal of American aid from the National Civil Police and Institute for Access to Public Information four months into the Biden administration, and saying that the United States now only supported the civil liberties of gangs.

See also 

 2022–23 Honduran gang crackdown

References

Further reading 

 

Conflicts in 2022
Conflicts in 2023
March 2022 events in North America
Human rights in El Salvador
Organized crime conflicts
2022 in El Salvador
2023 in El Salvador
MS-13
Gangs in El Salvador